Chalcosyrphus (Neplas) pauxilla (Williston 1892), the Yellow-waisted Leafwalker, is a very rare species of syrphid fly collected in California and Mexico. Hoverflies get their names from the ability to remain nearly motionless while in flight. The adults are also known as flower flies for they are commonly found around and on flowers, from which they get both energy-giving nectar and protein-rich pollen.

Distribution
United States.

References

Eristalinae
Insects described in 1892
Diptera of North America
Hoverflies of North America
Taxa named by Samuel Wendell Williston